Parasophronica is a genus of longhorn beetles of the subfamily Lamiinae, containing the following species:

 Parasophronica albomaculata Breuning, 1956
 Parasophronica phlyaroides Breuning, 1982
 Parasophronica strandiella Breuning, 1940

References

Desmiphorini